The 2009 Macau Open Grand Prix Gold was a badminton tournament which took place at the Tap Seac Multi-sports Pavilion, Macau on 18 to 23 August 2009 and had a total purse of $120,000.

Men's singles

Seeds

 Lee Chong Wei (champion)
 Chen Jin (semifinals)
 Taufik Hidayat (semifinals)
 Wong Choong Hann (final)
 Chan Yan Kit (withdrew)
 Hsieh Yu-hsing (quarterfinals)
 Chetan Anand (quarterfinals)
 Jan Ø. Jørgensen (third round)
 Lee Tsuen Seng (first round)
 Arvind Bhat (quarterfinals)
 Chen Long (second round)
 Andrew Smith (first round)
 Marc Zwiebler (withdrew)
 Parupalli Kashyap (second round)
 Gong Weijie (third round)
 Sairul Amar Ayob (second round)

Finals

Women's singles

Seeds

 Zhou Mi (second round)
 Wang Lin (quarterfinals)
 Wang Yihan (champion)
 Pi Hongyan (withdrew)
 Wang Chen (semifinals)
 Jiang Yanjiao (final)
 Juliane Schenk (semifinals)
 Yip Pui Yin (quarterfinals)

Finals

Men's doubles

Seeds

  Koo Kien Keat / Tan Boon Heong (champion)
  Choong Tan Fook / Lee Wan Wah (final)
  Hendra Aprida Gunawan / Alvent Yulianto (second round)
  Chen Hung-ling / Lin Yu-lang (second round)
  Sun Junjie / Tao Jiaming (quarterfinals)
  Candra Wijaya / Rendra Wijaya (second round)
  Fang Chieh-min / Lee Sheng-mu (second round)
  Chan Chong Ming / Chew Choon Eng (quarterfinals)

Finals

Women's doubles

Seeds

  Du Jing / Yu Yang (champion)
  Shinta Mulia Sari / Yao Lei (quarterfinals)
  Yang Wei / Zhang Jiewen (final)
  Ma Jin / Wang Xiaoli (quarterfinals)
  Gao Ling / Wei Yili (semifinals)
  Helle Nielsen / Marie Røpke (quarterfinals)
  Wang Siyun / Zhang Jinkang (quarterfinals)
  Zhang Dan / Zhang Zhibo (semifinals)

Finals

Mixed doubles

Seeds

  He Hanbin / Yu Yang (champion)
  Valiyaveetil Diju / Jwala Gutta (withdrew)
  Yohan Hadikusumo Wiratama / Chau Hoi Wah (quarterfinals)
  Mikkel Delbo Larsen / Mie Schjøtt-Kristensen (semifinals)
  Chen Zhiben / Zhang Jinkang (semifinals)
  Wang Chia-min / Wang Pei-rong (first round)
  Ong Jian Guo / Chong Sook Chin (second round)
  Halim Haryanto / Peng Yun (first round)

Finals

References

External links
 Tournament Link

Macau Open Badminton Championships
Macau Open
Macau Open